8 Homeward is a lunar impact crater that is located on the southern hemisphere on the far side of the Moon.  It is visible in the left horizon of the famous Earthrise photograph (AS08-14-2383) taken by astronaut William Anders on the Apollo 8 mission to the Moon in 1968.  The crater's name was approved by the IAU on 5 October 2018. The crater Anders' Earthrise, also visible in the Earthrise photograph, was named at the same time.

8 Homeward was previously designated Ganskiy M.  It lies west of the crater Pasteur and south of Ganskiy.

References 

Apollo 8